Diana Lucas Msewa (born 5 November 2002) is a Tanzanian professional footballer who plays as a forward for Ausfaz Assa Zag and the Tanzania women's national team.

International career 
In 2019, Msewa earned a call up to the Tanzania women's under-20 team for the inaugural 2019 COSAFA U-20 Women's Championship. At the end of the competition they emerged champions after defeating Zambia by 2–1 in the final. During the 2020 African U-20 Women's World Cup Qualifying Tournament, Msewa scored both first goals in the first and second legs of the preliminary round qualifiers against Uganda leading to the 4–2 victory on aggregate to advance to the first round.

In 2019, she was promoted to the senior team and made the squad for the 2019 CECAFA Women's Championship. She later named in the 2021 COSAFA Women's Championship squad list. She played four matches during the competition as Tanzania emerged champions for the first time in history.

Honours 

 COSAFA U-20 Women's Championship: 2019
 COSAFA Women's Championship: 2021

References

External links 

 

Living people
2002 births
Tanzanian women's footballers
Tanzania women's international footballers
Women's association football forwards